The 2016 Manly Warringah Sea Eagles season was the 67th in the club's history. The year also represented the 70th anniversary of the Manly Warringah Sea Eagles since their entry into the then New South Wales Rugby Football League premiership in 1947.

The 2016 Sea Eagles will be coached by rookie coach, former Australian international Trent Barrett. The team captain is Jamie Lyon with Brett Stewart and Daly Cherry-Evans named as vice-captains. The club will compete in the National Rugby League's 2016 Telstra Premiership.

Squad list

Signings/transfers

Gains
Rhys Armstrong from Wests Tigers
Lewis Brown from Penrith Panthers
Addin Fonua-Blake from St George Illawarra Dragons
Pita Godinet from Wakefield Trinity Wildcats
Fabian Goodall from Parramatta Eels
Nathan Green from St George Illawarra Dragons
Isaac John from Penrith Panthers
Dylan Kelly from Berkeley Vale Panthers
Apisai Koroisau from Penrith Panthers
Halauafu Lavaka from Parramatta Eels
Darcy Lussick from Parramatta Eels
Tim Moltzen from Wests Tigers
Nate Myles from Gold Coast Titans
Matt Parcell from Brisbane Broncos
Martin Taupau from Wests Tigers
Siosaia Vave from Cronulla-Sutherland Sharks
Dylan Walker from South Sydney Rabbitohs
Matthew Wright from North Queensland Cowboys
Tom Wright from rugby union

Losses
Matt Ballin to Wests Tigers
Cheyse Blair to Melbourne Storm
Michael Chee-Kam to Wests Tigers
Kieran Foran to Parramatta Eels
Clinton Gutherson to Parramatta Eels
James Hasson to Parramatta Eels
Peta Hiku to Penrith Panthers
Justin Horo to Catalans Dragons
Jack Littlejohn to Wests Tigers
Dunamis Lui to St George Illawarra Dragons
Willie Mason to Catalans Dragons
Will Pearsall to Newcastle Knights
Ligi Sao to New Zealand Warriors
Jesse Sene-Lefao to Cronulla Sharks

Ladder

Fixtures
2016 NRL draw - Manly-Warringah Sea Eagles.

Regular season

Bye

Bye

* 14 May - Manly home game despite playing Brisbane Broncos in Brisbane. Match played as part of an NRL double header at Suncorp Stadium.* 16 July - Manly home game played in Perth.

Player statistics
Note: Games and (sub) show total games played, e.g. 1 (1) is 2 games played.

 On 27 April, Manly team captain Jamie Lyon announced that he would retire from playing at the end of the 2016 NRL season after 17 seasons of first grade and representative football in both the NRL and the Super League.
 Tim Moltzen retired from playing effective immediately on 6 May 2016 due to chronic knee injuries. He was replaced in the squad by Matthew Wright who was signed mid-season after being granted a release from the North Queensland Cowboys.
 On 15 June, Tom Symonds signed a 3½ year deal with the Huddersfield Giants in the Super League after being released from his contract by Manly.
 On 23 June the Manly-Warringah Sea Eagles released Luke Burgess and Feleti Mateo from their contracts. Both players had signed with Super League team the Salford Red Devils the previous day.

Awards
Manly Warringah 2016 Club Awards (NRL only).
 Roy Bull Best & Fairest:  Tom Trbojevic
 Gordon Willoughby Medal - Members’ Player of the Year:  Jake Trbojevic
 Doug Daley Memorial Award - Clubman of the Year:  Brenton Lawrence
 Players’ Player Award:  Jake Trbojevic
 Ken Arthurson Award - Rookie of the Year:  Addin Fonua-Blake
 Leading point scorer:  Jamie Lyon (116 - 4 tries, 50 goals)
 Leading try scorer:  Jorge Taufua (12)

References

External links
Manly Warringah Sea Eagles official website
National Rugby League official website

Manly Warringah Sea Eagles seasons
Manly-Warringah Sea Eagles season